Bernard "Barney" Stafford Johnson was a horticulturalist who became the first television gardener in Ireland, presenting The Garden on RTE from 1977 to 1979.  He worked at the Marlfield Nursery in Dublin from 1953. His son is the nature film maker and presenter Colin Stafford-Johnson.

References

1979 deaths
Irish gardeners
Irish television presenters